Prohibitin-2 is a protein that in humans is encoded by the PHB2 gene.

Interactions
PHB2 has been shown to interact with PTMA.

References

Further reading